William Ross Johnston is a historian in Queensland, Australia. In 2012, he was awarded the John Douglas Kerr Medal of Distinction for his rigour in his teaching and research of Queensland's history.

References

Historians of Australia
Living people
Year of birth missing (living people)